Top Model po-russki, cycle 4 was the fourth installment of the Russian adaptation of Tyra Banks' America's Next Top Model. This cycle featured a fully revamped judging panel: Ksenia Sobchak was replaced by Irina Shayk as host, with the judging panel being J. Alexander, Tess Feuilhade, and Vincent McDoom. The entire cycle was filmed in Paris, France, and aired on You-tv from September to December 2012. Beginning with this cycle, episodes began to be aired once a week. Shortly following the cycle's conclusion, it was announced that a fifth cycle would not be broadcast; however the show returned in 2014 after a two-year hiatus.

The prize package for this cycle included a fashion spread in Cosmopolitan magazine as well as a cover appearance in Cosmopolitan Beauty, a trip to a spa resort in Slovenia courtesy of Orsoten Slim, and a modelling contract with Women Management.

The winner of the competition was 22-year-old Yulya Farkhutdinova from Lensk.

Cast

Contestants

(Ages stated are at start of contest)

Judges
Irina Shayk (host)
J. Alexander
Tess Feuilhade
Vincent McDoom

Other cast members
Alexei Moskalenko - mentor

Episodes

Results

  The contestant was put through collectively to the next round 
 The contestant was eliminated outside of judging panel
 The contestant was eliminated
 The contestants were in the bottom two, but nobody was eliminated
 The contestant won the competition

Notes

References

Top Model series (Russia)
2012 Russian television seasons